Sašo Krstev or Saško Krstev (born 1 November 1975) is a Macedonian retired international footballer who last played for FK Vardar Negotino.

International career
He made his senior debut for Macedonia in a March 2001 FIFA World Cup qualification match away against Sweden and has earned a total of 6 caps, scoring no goals. His final international was a November 2005 friendly match against Iran.

Honours and awards
FK Vardar
Macedonian Cup: 
Winner (2): 1997–98, 1998–99
FK Pobeda
Macedonian First League: 
Winner (1): 2003–04
Macedonian Cup: 
Winner (1): 2001–02

References

External links
 

1975 births
Living people
People from Negotino
Association football forwards
Macedonian footballers
North Macedonia international footballers
FK Vardar players
FK Pobeda players
FK Vëllazërimi 77 players
FK Renova players
FK Milano Kumanovo players
Macedonian First Football League players